Yihyah a Hebrew given name, a variant of Yehya, Yehia, Yahia Yahya, Yihye, etc. It may refer to:

Yiḥyah Qafiḥ (1850–1931), Chief Rabbi in Yemen 
Yiḥyah Salaḥ, alternatively Yichya Tzalach; Yehiya Saleh), known by the acronym of Maharitz (1713–1805), rabbi in Yemen
Yihya Yitzhak Halevi  (1867 – 1932)